The 2011 African Women's Youth Handball Championship was the 3rd edition of the tournament, organized by the African Handball Confederation, under the auspices of the International Handball Federation. The tournament was held in Ouagadougou, Burkina Faso from August 7 to 13, 2011.

Angola was the champion and the tournament qualified the top four teams to the 2012 world championship.

Draw

Preliminary round
6 teams were drawn into two groups of three, with the two top teams of each group playing the semifinals while the two third-placed teams played for the 5th place.

All times are local (UTC).

Group A

Group B

Placement round 5–6

Final round

Bracket

Semi finals

Bronze medal game

Final

Final standings

Awards

See also
 2012 African Women's Handball Championship
 2011 African Women's Junior Handball Championship

References

External links

2011 in African handball
African Women's Youth Handball Championship
International sports competitions hosted by Burkina Faso
Youth